The Gold Medal of the City of Milan was a French medal issued in 1909 to commemorate the fiftieth anniversary of France's 1859 Italian campaign, an intervention in the Second Italian War of Independence.

Regiment recipients
 9th Hussar Regiment (France)
 13th Parachute Dragoon Regiment

Military awards and decorations of France